In the mathematical theory of knots, a flype is a kind of manipulation of knot and link diagrams 
used in the Tait flyping conjecture.
It consists of twisting a part of a knot, a tangle T, by 180 degrees. Flype comes from a Scots word meaning to fold or to turn back ("as with a sock"). Two reduced alternating diagrams of an alternating link can be transformed to each other using flypes. This is the Tait flyping conjecture, proven in 1991 by Morwen Thistlethwaite and William Menasco.

See also
 Reidemeister moves are another commonly studied kind of manipulation to knot diagrams.

References

Knot operations